Sanzaru Games, Inc. is an American video game development company that was founded in Foster City, California in 2006. Sanzaru also has a satellite studio based in Ottawa, Ontario called Kitazaru, as well as an office in Dublin, California. The company name is based on the three wise monkeys (called sanzaru in Japan).

History
Their first game was Ninja Reflex, released on March 1, 2008, for PC, Nintendo DS and Wii. Their second game was a port of the High Impact Games developed PlayStation Portable game Secret Agent Clank, released on May 26, 2009, for PlayStation 2. Their third game was a high definition remastered collection of the Sly Cooper games originally developed by Sucker Punch Productions for the PlayStation 2, titled The Sly Collection and released on November 9, 2010, for PlayStation 3 and PlayStation Vita. Their fourth game was Mystery Case Files: The Malgrave Incident, which they assisted in development with Big Fish Games on, was released on June 27, 2011, for Wii. Their fifth game is Sly Cooper: Thieves in Time, which was set to be released late 2012, but was delayed to February 2013. Their latest game was revealed as a remake of Spyro: Year of the Dragon, which was included in the Spyro Reignited trilogy.

On October 10, 2019, the company released Asgard's Wrath, an epic AAA VR action adventure title on the Oculus Rift. It was critically praised by various media such as IGN, UploadVR and VRFocus.

On February 25, 2020, the company was acquired by Facebook as part of its Oculus Studios.

Games

References

External links

American companies established in 2006
Video game companies based in California
Video game development companies
Software companies based in the San Francisco Bay Area
Companies based in Foster City, California
Video game companies established in 2006
2007 establishments in California
2020 mergers and acquisitions
Meta Platforms acquisitions
Oculus VR